The Incredible Kai Winding Trombones is an album by American jazz trombonist Kai Winding featuring performances recorded in 1960 for the Impulse! label.

Reception
The Allmusic review by Scott Yanow awarded the album 4 stars calling it "Fine straight-ahead music obviously most enjoyed by listeners who like the sound of trombones".

Track listing
 "Speak Low" (Ogden Nash, Kurt Weill) — 4:08
 "Lil Darlin'" (Neil Hefti) — 4:07
 "Doodlin'" (Horace Silver) — 3:36
 "Love Walked In" (George Gershwin, Ira Gershwin) — 2:56
 "Mangos" (Dee Libby, Sid Wayne) — 3:46
 "Impulse" (Kai Winding) — 3:14
 "Black Coffee" (Sonny Burke, Paul Francis Webster) — 4:09
 "Bye Bye Blackbird" (Mort Dixon, Ray Henderson) — 4:02
 "Michie" (Slow) (Winding) — 3:05
 "Michie" (Fast) (Winding) — 3:48
Recorded at Rudy Van Gelder Studio in Englewood Cliffs, New Jersey on November 17, 1960 (tracks 6 & 9), November 21, 1960 (tracks 1, 4 & 5), November 23, 1960 (tracks 2 & 3) and December 13, 1960 (tracks 7, 8 & 10)

Personnel
Kai Winding — trombone
Jimmy Knepper (tracks 7, 8 & 10), Johnny Messner (tracks 1-5), Ephie Resnick (tracks 6 & 9) — trombone
Paul Faulise, Dick Lieb (tracks 7, 8 & 10), Tony Studd (tracks 1-6 & 9) — bass trombone
Bill Evans (tracks 7, 8 & 10), Ross Tompkins (tracks 1-6 & 9) — piano
Ray Starling (tracks 1 & 2) — mellophone
Bob Cranshaw (tracks 1-6 & 9), Ron Carter (tracks 7, 8 & 10) — bass
Al Beldini (tracks 1-6 & 9), Sticks Evans (tracks 7, 8 & 10) — drums
Olatunji - congas (tracks 1 & 5)

References

Impulse! Records albums
Kai Winding albums
1960 albums
Albums produced by Creed Taylor
Albums recorded at Van Gelder Studio